Tarvos may refer to:

 Tarvos Trigaranus, "the bull with three cranes", a Gaulish god
 Tarvos (moon), a moon of Saturn named after the god
 Tarvos (.hack), a character in the .hack franchise